Calanthe discolor is a species of orchid. It is native to Korea, Japan (including Nansei-shoto), and China (Anhui, Fujian, Guangdong, Guizhou, Hubei, Hunan, Jiangsu, Jiangxi, Zhejiang). It is a well-known species found in Japan, the southern part of Korea and China. Its vernacular name in Japanese, ebine, (海老根) means "shrimp-root" in reference to the shape of the plant's pseudobulbs and root system.

Varieties
Two varieties are currently accepted (May 2014):

Calanthe discolor var. amamiana (Fukuy.) Masam. – Nansei-shoto
Calanthe discolor var. discolor – China, Korea, Japan (including Nansei-shoto)

References

External links

discolor
Orchids of Japan
Orchids of Korea
Orchids of China
Plants described in 1838